Dezavar (also Romanized as Dezāvar; also known as Dabjūr, Dījvar, and Dijwar) is a village in Sirvan Rural District, Nowsud District, Paveh County, Kermanshah Province, Iran. At the 2006 census, its population was 200, in 72 families.

References 

Populated places in Paveh County